Bifurca is a monotypic moth genus in the subfamily Lymantriinae. Its only species, Bifurca longinasus, is found in Vietnam. Both the genus and the species were first described by Joseph de Joannis in 1929.

References

Lymantriinae
Monotypic moth genera